Australia is the fourth studio album released by Mango, in 1985.

It was the first true success of Mango, after three records ignored by critics and mass media. Among the most important songs are the title-track and "Il viaggio", which was performed at the Sanremo Music Festival in the same year.

The CD version was issued in 1990.

Track listing

Personnel
Mango – lead vocals, choirs, keyboards, synthesizer
Mauro Paoluzzi – guitars
Aldo Banfi – synclavier, synthesizer
Julius Farmer – bass, double bass
Lele Melotti – drums, percussion
Laura Valente – choirs in "La massa indistinguibile" and "Mr. noi"

References 
 

Mango albums
1985 albums